Regionalverkehr Bern-Solothurn RBS is a Swiss public transport company. It operates train, tram, and bus lines between Bern, Solothurn and Worb.

There had been a desire for a direct connection between Solothurn and Bern since the middle of the nineteenth century, only partly satisfied by the opening of a standard gauge line between Solothurn and Burgdorf by the Emmentalbahn in 1876. A campaign for a line via Fraubrunnen finally resulted in a concession granted in 1912 for the Elektrische Solothurn-Bern-Bahn (ESB) to build a metre-gauge line between Solothurn and Zollikofen. Here it would connect with the Bern-Zollikofen-Bahn, which had been opened in the same year. The full line was opened on 9 April 1916, but for the first eight years, passengers were obliged to change trains in Zollikofen. Public pressure led to the fusion of the two lines into the Solothurn-Zollikofen-Bahn (SZB) in 1922.

The town of Worb had been connected to Bern by the Bern-Worb-Bahn (BWB) in 1898, and the Worblentalbahn subsequently connected Worb with the villages of the Worble valley, making a connection with the BZB line at Worblaufen. The two lines to Worb fused in 1927 into the Vereinigte Bern-Worb-Bahnen (VBW). After a series of working agreements in the 1970s, the SZB and the VWB finally merged into the RBS in November 1984 through a series of mergers. 94% of RBS shares are owned by federal, cantonal and local authorities.

As of 2006, the company has 361 employees and owns 185 vehicles. It operates on 57 km of track and 61 km of bus lines and transports 23.5 million passengers each year. The subterranean RBS train station in Bern is the country's eighth-largest in terms of passenger usage, with 49,000 people using it on peak days. This heavy usage leads to overcrowding during peak hours. To increase the station's passenger handling capacity and reduce overcrowding, strict rules have been put into place to govern passenger flow.

A steady programme of track-doubling has significantly increased track capacity. Planning has already started to increase the size and capacity of the station in terms of passenger flow and number of trains it can handle. In 2009, a 15-minute interval for all lines was planned, which takes the station to the limit of its ability to handle passengers.

New 120 km/h train sets have been introduced on the RE line (Bern - Solothurn) to enable running at 15-minute intervals. These sets were made by Stadler Rail AG.

References

 Annual report, 2006

External links

 

 
Railway companies of Switzerland
Transport companies of Switzerland
Metre gauge railways in Switzerland
Railway companies established in 1984
Swiss companies established in 1984
Transport companies established in 1984